Zhan Huo (720–621 BCE), courtesy name Qin (changed at 50 years of age to Ji ), was an ancient Chinese politician. He was canonised as Hui, and is now commonly known as Liuxia Hui.

He was governor of the District of Liuxia in the Lu State. He was a man of eminent virtue, and is said on one occasion to have held a lady in his lap without the slightest imputation on his moral character. When he died, his wife insisted on pronouncing a funeral oration over his body, urging that none knew his great merits so well as her.

References

720 BC births
621 BC deaths
Zhou dynasty politicians
Politicians from Shandong
Lu (state)